Alessandro Guidiccioni (1557–1637) was a Roman Catholic prelate who served as Bishop of Lucca (1600–1637).

Biography
Alessandro Guidiccioni was born in 1557.
On 27 November 1600, he was appointed during the papacy of Pope Clement VIII as Bishop of Lucca.
On 8 December 1600, he was consecrated bishop by Federico Borromeo, Archbishop of Milan, with Mario Bolognini, Archbishop of Salerno, and Lorenzo Celsi, Bishop of Castro del Lazio, serving as co-consecrators. 
He served as Bishop of Lucca until his death on 16 March 1637.

Episcopal succession
While bishop, he was the principal co-consecrator of:

References 

17th-century Italian Roman Catholic bishops
Bishops appointed by Pope Clement VIII
1557 births
1637 deaths